Franck Esposito (born 13 April 1971 in Salon-de-Provence, Bouches-du-Rhône) is a former World Record holding, and four-time Olympic, butterfly swimmer from France. He swam for France at the 1996, 2000 and 2004 Olympics; and won the bronze medal in the 200 Butterfly at the 1992 Olympics. During his career, he set the short course World Record in the 200 fly four times.

He won a total number of four European titles in long course, starting from 1991. Esposito broke the world record in the 200 m butterfly (short course) four times.

At the 1991 World Championships, he lowered the French Record in the long course 200 Fly for the first time (1:59.00). He subsequently bettered the record six more times, and as of 2013 still holds the record at 1:54.62 which he swam at the 2002 French Championships (at the time, also a European Record). He also held the French Record in the long course 100 fly from August 1993 – April 2008.

See also
 Franck Esposito

References

External links
 Personal website: www.franckesposito.fr

1971 births
Living people
People from Salon-de-Provence
French male butterfly swimmers
Olympic swimmers of France
Swimmers at the 1992 Summer Olympics
Swimmers at the 1996 Summer Olympics
Swimmers at the 2000 Summer Olympics
Swimmers at the 2004 Summer Olympics
World record setters in swimming
Olympic bronze medalists in swimming
World Aquatics Championships medalists in swimming
Medalists at the FINA World Swimming Championships (25 m)
European Aquatics Championships medalists in swimming
Medalists at the 1992 Summer Olympics
Olympic bronze medalists for France
Mediterranean Games gold medalists for France
Swimmers at the 1993 Mediterranean Games
Swimmers at the 1997 Mediterranean Games
Swimmers at the 2001 Mediterranean Games
Goodwill Games medalists in swimming
Sportspeople from Bouches-du-Rhône
Mediterranean Games medalists in swimming
Competitors at the 1998 Goodwill Games